Memedi is a surname. Notable people with the surname include:

 Abdula Memedi (born 1952), Yugoslav wrestler
 Nazif Memedi (born 1956), Croatian politician of Romani ethnicity
 Nedžmedin Memedi (born 1966), Albanian football midfielder